The 2018–19 SIU Edwardsville Cougars men's basketball team represented Southern Illinois University Edwardsville during the 2018–19 NCAA Division I men's basketball season. The Cougars, led by fourth-year head coach Jon Harris, played their home games at the Vadalabene Center in Edwardsville, Illinois as members of the Ohio Valley Conference. They finished the season 10–21, 6–12 in OVC play to finish in a four-way tie for seventh place. As the No. 8 seed, they lost in the first round of the OVC tournament to Morehead State.

Previous season 
The Cougars finished the 2017–18 season 9–21, 5–13 in OVC play to finish in a three-way tie for ninth place. Due to Southeast Missouri State being ineligible for postseason play due to APR violations, the Cougars received the No. 8 seed in the OVC tournament where they lost in the first round to Tennessee Tech.

Preseason 
In a vote of conference coaches and sports information directors, SIUE was picked to finish in 12th place in the OVC.

Postseason
On March 11, 2019, SIUE announced that coach Jon Harris' contract had not been renewed after a four-year record of 31 wins and 88 losses. Assistant coaches Brian Barone, Charles "Bubba" Wells, and Mike Waldo were all retained, with Barone being named as interim head coach. Former head coach Marty Simmons, one of only three Cougars coaches with a winning record, has expressed an interest in returning.

Roster

Schedule and results

|-
!colspan=9 style=| Exhibition

|-
!colspan=9 style=| Non-conference regular season

|-
!colspan=9 style=| Ohio Valley Conference regular season

|-
!colspan=9 style=|Ohio Valley Conference tournament

References 

SIU Edwardsville
SIU Edwardsville Cougars men's basketball seasons
Edward
Edward